The Iglesia de la Vera Cruz or de la Veracruz (church of Vera Cruz) is a Catholic church located in Barrio Lastarria in the center of Santiago, Chile.

Construction on the church began in 1852 with a proposal by Salvador Tavira to preserve the place where Pedro de Valdivia had lived by building a memorial church for the conquistador, under the guidance of architect Claudio Brunet de Baines. Upon Brunet de Baines’ death in 1855, work was continued by architect Fermín Vivaceta and inaugurated in advance during Chilean Fiestas Patrias celebrations in 1855. The church was completed in 1857.

In 1983 the Iglesia de la Vera Cruz and its parish residence were declared National Monuments by the Ministry of Education.

In Novembre 12th of 2019, the church was burned after social riots.

References

External links 

Churches in Santiago, Chile
Roman Catholic churches in Chile

:es:Iglesia de la Vera Cruz (Santiago de Chile)